This is a list of notable incidents that have taken place at Warner Bros. Movie World in Gold Coast, Queensland Australia.

The term incident refers to major injury, injuries, deaths, and significant crimes. While these incidents are required to be reported to regulatory authorities for investigation, attraction-related incidents usually fall into one of these following categories:
 Negligence on the part of the park, either by ride operator or maintenance.
 Caused by negligence on the part of the guest. This can be refusal to follow specific ride safety instructions, or deliberate intent to break park rules.
 The result of a guest's known, or unknown, health issues.
 Act of God or a generic accident (e.g. slipping and falling) that is not a direct result of an action on anyone's part.

Green Lantern Coaster

On 8 January 2013, the coaster stopped on the tracks twice. Before noon, eight teenagers were stuck on the ride for 70 minutes due to a minor wiring issue. Later, eight more teenagers were stuck on the ride for half an hour while the problem was identified and fixed.
On 15 March 2015, one car of a train became detached from rails when a wheel mechanism broke. A Queensland Fire Service Inspector described it as "a fairly catastrophic failure of the carriage" that was the "first time we'd ever seen the actual failure of the machinery". An investigation revealed that there was a design flaw in the wheel assembly dealing with a bolted joint, and that there was "really nothing that Movie World could have done to prevent it. S&S Worldwide redesigned the flawed components, and tested the ride, before it reopened to the public on December 16, 2015.
On 19 November 2016, the coaster stopped on the tracks for 30 minutes due to a "computer fault", leaving sixteen guests stuck on the ride.

Looney Tunes Carousel 
 On 5 April 2022, a 12-year-old boy was hospitalised with serious injuries after falling off the carousel at around 1pm. The boy had suffered head injuries with a laceration to his head. The ride is currently closed until further notice.

DC Rivals HyperCoaster

On 29 July 2019, a 10-year-old girl was struck in the face by an ibis while riding the DC Rivals Hypercoaster.

Doomsday Destroyer
On 31 January 2018, the ride safety operating system automatically engaged trapping guests upside down for three minutes. No firefighters or paramedics were called. The ride was due for maintenance in August 2018.

Arkham Asylum – Shock Therapy

On 10 January 2017, around noon, the coaster's lift chain malfunctioned, leaving 19 women and one man stuck on top of the lift hill for 40 minutes. Firefighters used a cherry picker to rescue four of the patrons while the rest descended via a staircase on the lift.

Police Academy Stunt Show

On 5 February 2003, three  experienced pyrotechnic workers suffered serious burns to their faces, bodies and hands in a powerful explosion at the Warner Roadshow Studios on the Gold Coast.

Guest altercations
In December 2008, 14-year-old Corey Cross was on a field-trip to Movie World when he was knocked down in a crowd, resulting in a broken wrist. He took the park to court, suing them for lost wages, due to him being unable to work as a paperboy with a broken wrist. The park settled out of court in 2010.

See also
 Incidents at Warner Bros. parks
 Amusement park accidents

References

Warner Bros. Movie World
Warner Bros. Global Brands and Experiences
Warner Bros. Discovery-related lists
Lists of events in Australia
Warner Bros. Movie World